Heinz Baumann (12 February 1928 – 14 March 2023) was a German actor.

Baumann died in Munich, Bavaria on 14 March 2023, at the age of 95.

Selected filmography
 Hubertus Castle (1954) - Tassilo
 The Haunted Castle (1960) - Martin Hartog
 Irrungen, Wirrungen (1966, TV film) - Pitt
 I'm an Elephant, Madame (1969) - Dr. Nemitz
 Und Jimmy ging zum Regenbogen (1971) - Gilbert Grant
 All People Will Be Brothers (1973) - William Carpenter
 Only the Wind Knows the Answer (1974) - Bankmanager Dr. Rüth
  (1976, TV series) - Lobster
 Der Geist der Mirabelle (1978, TV film), as Lauritz
 Der Gärtner von Toulouse (1982, TV film) - Querchartre
  (1993, TV film) - Herbert Wehner
 Diebinnen (1996)
 Doppelspiel (2006) - Otto Endlich

References

External links
 

1928 births
2023 deaths
German male film actors
People from Oldenburg (city)